The Danish Cycling Federation or DCU (in Danish: Danmarks Cykle Union) is the national governing body of cycle racing in Denmark.

The DCU is a member of the UCI and the UEC.

See also
 Cycling Embassy of Denmark
 Cycling in Denmark
 Cycling in Copenhagen
 Danish Cyclists Federation
 Outline of cycling

External links
 Danish Cycling Federation official website

National members of the European Cycling Union
Cycling
Cycle racing organizations
Cycle racing in Denmark
Cycling in Denmark